Franciszek Jerzy Stefaniuk (born 4 June 1944 in Drelów) is a Polish farmer and politician from agrarian Polish People's Party (Polskie Stronnictwo Ludowe), who served as a Sejm member from the Contract Sejm (1989) until 2015, representing Chełm (7th district). He was re-elected for his eight term in October, 2011, winning 10,527 votes. Four years later he failed to secure a ninth term.

Known as one of his party leaders, he served as a Sejm Vice-Marshal from 1997 until 2001 (alongside Marek Borowski of Democratic Left Alliance, Jan Król of Freedom Union and Stanisław Zając of Solidarity Electoral Action.

He was one of the member of commission which issued a project of current constitution. From 2001 to 2005 he was chairman of the Sejm Constitutional Commission.

External links

 Sejm site
 Franciszek Stefaniuk's Official Sejm site

1944 births
Living people
20th-century Polish farmers
Deputy Marshals of the Sejm of the Third Polish Republic
Members of the Polish Sejm 1991–1993
Members of the Polish Sejm 1993–1997
Members of the Polish Sejm 1997–2001
Members of the Polish Sejm 2001–2005
Members of the Polish Sejm 2005–2007
Polish People's Party politicians
Members of the Polish Sejm 2007–2011
Members of the Polish Sejm 2011–2015
People from Biała Podlaska County
21st-century farmers